Roy Devyn Marble (born September 21, 1992) is an American professional basketball player for Hapoel Galil Elyon of the Israeli Basketball Premier League. He played college basketball for the Iowa Hawkeyes.

High school career
Marble attended Southfield-Lathrup High School in Southfield, Michigan. As a junior, he averaged 22 points, nine rebounds, four assists and two steals. As a senior, he averaged 24.5 points, eight rebounds, four assists and 2.5 steals per game.

Considered a three-star recruit by ESPN.com, Marble was listed as the No. 64 shooting guard in the nation in 2010.

Honors
2010 OAA first team
2010 Oakland County Dream Team
2010 Michigan All-Star
2009 Oakland Red first team
2009 All-State first team

College career
A two-time team captain of the Iowa Hawkeyes, Marble finished his college career as one of only two Big Ten players since 1985–86 to amass 1,675+ points, 375+ assists, 450+ rebounds and 175+ steals. He also finished his career ranked fifth in Iowa career scoring (1,694) and free throws made (432), sixth in assists (397) and free throws attempted (595), and seventh in steals (176), while his 136 games played tied Melsahn Basabe for second all-time at Iowa.

Professional career

Orlando Magic (2014–2016)

On June 26, 2014, Marble was selected with the 56th overall pick in the 2014 NBA draft by the Denver Nuggets. He was later traded to the Orlando Magic on draft night. He later joined the Magic for the 2014 NBA Summer League before signing his rookie scale contract with the team on July 24. During his rookie season, he was assigned multiple times to the Erie BayHawks of the NBA Development League.

On November 30, 2015, Marble was reassigned to the Erie BayHawks. He was recalled on December 23, reassigned on January 1, 2016, and recalled again on January 18.

On July 15, 2016, Marble was traded, along with a 2020 second-round draft pick, to the Los Angeles Clippers in exchange for C. J. Wilcox and cash considerations. He was subsequently waived by the Clippers upon being acquired by the team.

Europe (2016–present)
On August 10, 2016, Marble signed with Greek club Aris for the 2016–17 season. He had a contract dispute with the team on December 22, 2016, and was subsequently released and returned overseas.

On January 17, 2017, Marble signed with Italian club Aquila Basket Trento for the rest of the 2016–17 Serie A season. On April 7, 2017, he parted ways with Trento. In 10 games he averaged 10.4 points, 3.2 rebounds, and 2.1 assists per game. Marble suffered a season-ending knee injury and returned to the US to have surgery.

On July 31, 2018, Marble came back to Trento and signed a two-year deal with Aquila Basket.

After a short experience back in the American NBA G League with the Santa Cruz Warriors, where he played the first half of the 2019–20 season, Virtus Bologna brought him back to Italy when he signed a contract on January 22 until the end of the 2019-20 season. Marble averaged 6.5 points per game in seven games. On October 16, 2020, he signed with Astana in Kazakhstan.

On March 25, 2021, he signed with Maccabi Haifa of the Israeli Basketball Premier League.

On October 23, 2021, he has signed with MKS Dąbrowa Górnicza of the Polish Basketball League.

On March 7, 2022, he has signed with Enea Zastal Zielona Góra of the Polish Basketball League.

On July 19, 2022, he has signed with Legia Warszawa of the Polish Basketball League.

NBA career statistics

Regular season

|-
| style="text-align:left;"| 
| style="text-align:left;"| Orlando
| 16 || 7 || 13.0 || .318 || .182 || .313 || 1.9 || 1.1 || .6 || .1 || 2.3
|-
| style="text-align:left;"| 
| style="text-align:left;"| Orlando
| 28 || 0 || 8.9 || .296 || .250 || .417 || 1.4 || .4 || .5 || .0 || 2.1
|-
|- class="sortbottom"
| style="text-align:center;" colspan="2"| Career
| 44 || 7 || 10.4 || .304 || .222 || .375 || 1.6 || .7 || .5 || .1 || 2.2

Personal life
On March 9, 2013, he and his father, Roy Marble, became the first father-son duo to record 1,000 points each in Big Ten Conference history.

References

External links

Devyn Marble at basketballcl.com
Devyn Marble at eurobasket.com
Devyn marble at baskethotel.com
Iowa Hawkeyes bio

1992 births
Living people
21st-century African-American sportspeople
African-American basketball players
American expatriate basketball people in Greece
American expatriate basketball people in Italy
American men's basketball players
Aquila Basket Trento players
Aris B.C. players
Basket Zielona Góra players
Basketball players from Michigan
Denver Nuggets draft picks
Erie BayHawks (2008–2017) players
Iowa Hawkeyes men's basketball players
Lega Basket Serie A players
Legia Warsaw (basketball) players
MKS Dąbrowa Górnicza (basketball) players
Orlando Magic players
Santa Cruz Warriors players
Shooting guards
Small forwards
Sportspeople from Southfield, Michigan